Harwada railway station is one of the railway stations near Karwar in coastal Karnataka. One of the smaller stations on the Konkan Railway route, four trains halt here; there are no originating or terminating trains at this station.

Background
The station has only one platform, and a single diesel  broad gaugetrack.

Location
It is located seven meters above mean sea level.

The nearest airport, Goa's Dabolim Airport/GOI, is 89 kilometres away. The National Highway 66 NH66 (previously numbered as NH 17) connecting city of Panvel to Kochi passes beside Harawada railroad station.

References

Railway stations in Uttara Kannada district
Railway stations along Konkan Railway line
Railway stations opened in 1997
Karwar railway division